The Grand View Beach Railway 
was a scenic electric street railway along 
the shore of Lake Ontario from the village 
of Ontario Beach, a suburb of Rochester, to Manitou Beach.

Route 

For several miles
out of Ontario Beach the road ran along a bluff close to and overlooking the expanse 
From Rigney's Bluff westward to Manitou the track threaded a 
sandy beach between the great lake and various little 
bays and ponds.

Stops and sidings 
0. Siding #1, Spitz Hotel, 160 Beach Ave. 
1. Wilder Terr. 
2. Hospital, Rear Summer Hospital for Children 
3. Cloverdale Farm City line - Spur to water works - was siding #2 
4. Little Pond  
5. Rigney's Bluff (Shoremont)  
6. Siding #3  
7. Fehrenback's Lake View Hotel Adolph Grossmans Hotel at Round Pond Outlet Breakers  
8. Island Cottage on left - Edgewater Hotel on Lakeshore (Louis Cook's)  
9. Buck Pond  
10. Crescent Beach-W.H. Lewis Prop. 1910 later Ray Gets Pass switch siding #4  
11. Later passing switch, Lewis straight  
12. Outlet - Long Pond, West end trestle  
13. Long Pond, Grand View Beach Hotel - A. Kleinhans later Joe Rosenbach  
14. Lowden Point Road  
15. Siding Pass #5, Half Way  
16. 
17. Springwater Hotel  
18. 
19. Cranberry Pond 
20. Siding #6 
21. Braddocks Heights  
22. E. Manitou  
23. Elmheart Hotel  
24. Passing track #7, Manitou Beach

Trestles and accommodation 
Ontario Beach Park, Charlotte, Rochester, New York 
Little Round Pond, Island Cottage 
Round Pond, Edgewater Hotel 
Buck Pond, Crescent Beach Hotel
Long Pond, Grand View Beach
Cranberry Pond, East Manitou Hotel
Braddocks Bay, Elmheart Hotel
Manitou, Odenbachs

Infrastructure 
The railroad was of modern construction and 
equipment. The track was 45-pound steel T rail. The 
rolling stock consisted of 7 motor cars, five open and two 
closed, and 7 open trail-cars, which could comfortably seat 
60 to 70 persons. Rae motors of 40-horse-power 
were used and the old reliable McGuire truck.

It was equipped with two Thompson-Houston 8,000-Watt 
generators, two engines of Mclntosh-Seymour and 
three 100-horse-power boilers from the Pierce & Thomas 
shops.

The car-barn, located near 
the power house had storage capacity for 20 cars.

Accidents 
While erecting the last trestle over the Braddock's Bay, a sudden storm arose, and two men working in the middle of the bay on the trestle were drowned before they could be reached by help.

In 1904, four passengers were killed and nine were injured in a collision on the line.

History 
The cars began running in June 1891, but the railroad was in 
an unfinished condition until about August 1. To October 
1st the total earnings were $17,976.08, operating expenses 
$8,500.06, interest and taxes $4,010.34, surplus $4,465.14. 
The total number of passengers carried was 150,000.

The initial officers of the company were: 
H. H. Craig, president
M. Doyle, vice-president
J. Miller Kelly, secretary and treasurer
E. A. Roworth, superintendent

The line was subsequently operated by the Rochester, Charlotte & Manitou Beach Railroad (1895-1908) and the Rochester & Manitou Railroad (1908-1925).
The last car ran on the line in 1925.

Photos

Literature 
 William Reed Gordon: Manitou Beach trolley days, 1891-1925. Rochester, N.Y., 1957.

References 

Lake Ontario
Transportation in Rochester, New York
Streetcars in New York (state)
Defunct New York (state) railroads
Railway companies established in 1891
Standard gauge railways in the United States